Helmholtz pitch notation is a system for naming musical notes of the Western chromatic scale. Fully described and normalized by the German scientist Hermann von Helmholtz, it uses a combination of upper and lower case letters (A to G), and the sub- and super-prime symbols ( ͵  ′   or   ) to denote each individual note of the scale. It is one of two formal systems for naming notes in a particular octave, the other being scientific pitch notation.

History
Helmholtz proposed this system in order to accurately define pitches in his classical work on acoustics Die Lehre von den Tonempfindungen als physiologische Grundlage für die Theorie der Musik (1863) translated into English by A.J. Ellis as On the Sensations of Tone (1875).

Helmholtz based his notation on the practice of German organ builders for labelling their pipes, itself derived from the old German organ tablature in use from late medieval times until the early 18th century. His system is widely used by musicians across Europe and is the one used in the New Grove Dictionary. Once also widely used by scientists and doctors when discussing the scientific and medical aspects of sound in relation to the auditory system, it has now been replaced in the US in scientific and medical contexts by scientific pitch notation.

Use
The accenting of the scale in Helmholtz notation always starts on the note  C  and ends at B (e.g. C  D  E  F  G  A  B).

Middle C is designated c′, therefore the octave from middle C upwards is c′–b′.

Variations
 The English multiple-letter notation uses repeated Cs in place of the sub-prime symbol. Therefore  C͵  is rendered as  CC  ;  C͵͵ as CCC  ; etc.
Because the typesetting is difficult this notation has fallen out of use.
 Primes in subscript (or superscript) may be replaced with digits in subscript (superscript) indicating the number of primes; for example, ͵͵C or C2 or 2C, c″ or c2 (but not 2c).
 A system of pitch designation using uppercase and lowercase letters, commas and apostrophes, formally identical to Helmholtz pitch notation but shifted by one octave is used for ABC notation.
 LilyPond music publishing software uses an all-lowercase variant, where pitches that would be uppercase in Helmholtz notation are written with an additional sub-prime: c,,, and c,, and c, represent Helmholtz C͵͵ and C͵ and C respectively.

Octave and staff representation
Whole octaves may also be given a name based on "English strokes notation". For example, the octave from c′–b′ is called the one-line octave or (less common) once-accented octave. Correspondingly, the notes in the octave may be called one-lined C (for c′), etc.

This diagram gives examples of the lowest and highest note in each octave, giving their name in the Helmholtz system, and the "German method" of octave nomenclature. (The octave below the contra octave is known as the sub-contra octave).

See also
 Scientific pitch notation

Notes

References

External links
 
 

Musical notation
Pitch (music)
Hermann von Helmholtz